I Belong to Me is a 1967 Danish musical film directed by Erik Balling and starring Daimi.

Cast 

 Daimi – Annie Jensen
 Cæsar – Anders
 Peter Steen – Christian Holgersen
 Ove Sprogøe – Værgen
 Poul Bundgaard – Albert Hyldersen
 Karl Stegger – Tjeneren
 Poul Reichhardt – Kaptajn Sir William
 Henrik Wiehe – Bilist
 Bendt Rothe – Dommeren
 Vigga Bro – Hulda
 Christiane Rohde – Dorothea
 Ole Monty – Bilist
 Else-Marie – Fru Holgersen (as Else Marie)
 Ejner Nørby – Holgersen
 The Defenders – Themselves
 Jørgen Beck – Bonden
 Gunnar Bigum – Bedemand
 Poul Borum – Bartenderen
 Freddy Fræk
 Freddy Grakjær
 Gyda Hansen – Lily
 Lise Henningsen – Luderen
 Lotte Hermann – Rosa
 Edith Hermansen – Bondekonen
 Stig Hoffmeyer
 Inge Hyllested – Opsynet
 Bjørn Spiro – Butleren
 Gert Vindahl
 Kirsten Walther – Fru Hyldersen
 Bent Warburg

References

External links 
 
 

1967 films
1967 musical films
Danish musical films
1960s Danish-language films
Films directed by Erik Balling